The 1925 St. Louis Cardinals season was the team's 44th season in St. Louis, Missouri and the 34th season in the National League. The Cardinals went 77–76 during the season and finished 4th in the National League.

Regular season 
Early in the 1925 season, second baseman Rogers Hornsby was named player-manager of the Cardinals, replacing Branch Rickey, whose professorial style of managing had gone over the heads of most of his players. Immediately after taking over, Hornsby told his fellow players, "Let's cut this baloney and just play ball."  They went 64–51 the rest of the way.

The 1925 season also brought Hornsby's second triple crown. He posted a .403 batting average with 39 home runs and 143 RBI. He was named the National League's Most Valuable Player, having barely missed the award in 1924. His .756 slugging percentage that year is the highest in the National League during the 20th century.

Season standings

Record vs. opponents

Roster

Player stats

Batting

Starters by position 
Note: Pos = Position; G = Games played; AB = At bats; H = Hits; Avg. = Batting average; HR = Home runs; RBI = Runs batted in

Other batters 
Note: G = Games played; AB = At bats; H = Hits; Avg. = Batting average; HR = Home runs; RBI = Runs batted in

Pitching

Starting pitchers 
Note: G = Games pitched; IP = Innings pitched; W = Wins; L = Losses; ERA = Earned run average; SO = Strikeouts

Other pitchers 
Note: G = Games pitched; IP = Innings pitched; W = Wins; L = Losses; ERA = Earned run average; SO = Strikeouts

Relief pitchers 
Note: G = Games pitched; W = Wins; L = Losses; SV = Saves; ERA = Earned run average; SO = Strikeouts

Awards and honors 
Rogers Hornsby, Most Valuable Player award

League leaders 
Rogers Hornsby, National League batting champion

Records 
Rogers Hornsby, National League record, Best slugging average by a second baseman, (.756).
Rogers Hornsby, Major league record, Highest batting average in a five-season span (.402 average from 1921 to 1925)

Farm system

References

External links
1925 St. Louis Cardinals at Baseball Reference
1925 St. Louis Cardinals team page at www.baseball-almanac.com

St. Louis Cardinals seasons
Saint Louis Cardinals season
St Louis